Van Nuys is an unincorporated community in Henry Township, Henry County, Indiana and the site of the Indiana Village for Epileptics.

Geography

Van Nuys was named for the first medical doctor to be the director of the Indiana Village for Epileptics circa 1905. The Indiana Village for Epileptics later became New Castle State Hospital and was then renamed the New Castle Developmental Training Center before it was eventually closed.

Today the site contains a privately held prison which contracts to hold prisoners from Indiana and a number of other states.

References

Unincorporated communities in Henry County, Indiana
Unincorporated communities in Indiana